Alien 3 (stylized as A''LIEN³) is a run and gun video game based on the 1992 film of the same name. The game was released for the Sega Genesis and Amiga in 1992, with additional versions being released in 1993 for the Commodore 64, Game Boy, Game Gear, Nintendo Entertainment System (NES), Super Nintendo Entertainment System (SNES), and Master System.

Each version was developed by Probe Software, except for the Game Boy version, which was developed by Bits Studios. Acclaim Entertainment published the game, with Virgin Interactive Entertainment publishing the Europe-exclusive Amiga version. Alien 3 received generally positive reviews, with most critics praising its music and graphics.

GameplayAlien 3 is a side-scrolling run and gun in which the player controls Ellen Ripley, the film's main character, who progresses through the Fiorina 161 prison colony that was featured in the film. The player can jump, shoot, climb ladders, crawl through tunnels, open doors, and use elevators. Unlike the film, Ripley has a large arsenal of weapons that can be used against the game's enemies, consisting of Aliens and Facehuggers. Weapons include pulse rifles, flamethrowers, and grenades. A motion tracker warns the player of nearby enemies.

Level objectives are chosen from computer terminals, which are located throughout the game and also offer blueprints of the prison layout. Objectives include sealing off doors to prevent Aliens from entering, and rescuing prisoners. A time limit is present on each level, and the player loses a life if the level is not completed before the time expires. The game concludes with a battle between Ripley and the Alien Queen.

The SNES version includes six stages, and a password feature, which is absent from the Game Boy version. The Sega Genesis version includes 15 stages. The Genesis and SNES versions differ in design and graphics, and the Genesis version includes larger Alien character models. The Amiga version, which has 14 levels, features gameplay that moves slightly slower than the Genesis version, but is otherwise nearly identical. The Commodore 64 version has 15 levels, and is a nearly identical port of the Amiga version, but with slightly different level layouts. The Game Gear version is identical to the other versions of the game. The Master System version uses the same level layouts as the Genesis version, but includes a two-player option. The Game Boy version, unlike other versions of the game, is played from an overhead perspective.

Release
The Sega Genesis version was originally scheduled for a U.S. release in summer 1992, but was ultimately released in October 1992. In Europe, the Amiga version was released in November 1992. By January 1993, the Master System version had been released in the United Kingdom. In the United States, the Game Boy version was released in January 1993, while the NES version was released in March 1993, and the SNES version was released in June 1993. The SNES version was subsequently released in the United Kingdom in July 1993. The Commodore 64 version was released in Europe in November 1993.

ReceptionGamePro praised the SNES version for its music, sound effects, and graphics, and concluded that the game was "highly original–enough to please even jaded veterans of the Alien 3 wars on other systems." Jonathan Davies of Super Play praised the graphics of the SNES version and called it "damn good fun", while noting that it "makes effective use of the license without trying to be too true to it". Scott Alan Marriott of AllGame praised the sound and smooth animation of the SNES version and wrote, "Despite everything being gray and metallic-looking, the graphics are extremely impressive."Nintendo Power praised the SNES version's action, sound, graphics, and its diverse variety of missions, but criticized blueprints for only being accessible from computer terminals. Nintendo Magazine System praised the large number of levels in the SNES version, as well as the music and sound effects, but noted that the control system "takes a bit of getting used to." Nintendo Magazine System praised the music of the Game Boy version, but criticized the lack of abundant sound effects, as well as the absence of a password system. The magazine concluded that it was a "spiffing game, imaginatively designed and well-programmed". Nintendo Power praised the "very effective" cinema scenes in the Game Boy version, but criticized the controls for being slow to respond. Skyler Miller of AllGame noted that the NES version "isn't a mindless shooting fest," and wrote that the "atmosphere is appropriately creepy, with a gloomy color palette, foreboding soundtrack, and some semi-gory scenes."GamePro reviewed the Genesis version, praising the music and writing that it "balances straight-up arcade-style action with enough tension to effectively capture the nail-biting mood of the movie." Shawn Sackenheim of AllGame reviewed the Genesis version and wrote, "Graphically, Alien 3 has a lot going for it. The levels are vast and well detailed, the animation is smooth and believable, the game play is solid, and the challenge is just right. Control is excellent, though a bit troublesome when you are trying to land from jumps. […] The sound and music are a bit shoddy, however. The music is a rather shallow PCM score that doesn't really add to the game. The effects are also a bit weak, sounding rather mono and unrealistic." Sega Force praised the Genesis version for its controls, its graphics, its large number of levels, and noted that the "Suspenseful music gives the game a suitably scary feel." The magazine declared, "This is the game film fans have been waiting for!"Sega Force praised the graphics of the Master System version for looking similar to the Genesis version, and also praised its music, sound effects, and controls, but noted that the gameplay sometimes becomes repetitive. Sega Force also praised the music, sound effects, and graphics of the Game Gear version, but noted the repetitive gameplay. GamePro wrote that players should not expect the Game Gear version to "pack the same pulse-pounding action as the Genesis version. The Game Gear obviously doesn't pack enough power to match up with the 16-bit special effects. However, challenging gameplay and lengthy stages give the game more punch than average Game Gear fare." Mean Machines Sega reviewed the Game Gear version and praised its character animations and music, but criticized its sound effects and similar-looking backgrounds. The magazine also noted that it "doesn't move as well" as the Genesis version. Kyle Knight of AllGame reviewed the Game Gear version and criticized its music and "some quirky and occasionally frustrating AI actions". However, Knight wrote that the game "successfully combines exploration and action," and that the "background details and alien sprites are nicely done, but unfortunately the main character isn't."CU Amiga praised the Amiga version's graphics, sound effects, and music, and called it an "excellent Aliens game." The magazine's reviewer concluded, "This is one of the best movie-to-game conversions I've seen." James Price of Commodore Force praised the Commodore 64 version for its graphics, music, sound effects, and abundance of levels, and wrote that "despite its obvious technical excellence, it's glitchy in places. But with its large amount of options, surprisingly unobtrusive multi-load and large, well-designed levels, Alien 3's a winner." Commodore Format reviewed the Commodore 64 version and criticized the "fairly standard" gameplay, the similar levels, and the easiness, but praised the "well-paced" action and noted that the time limits add to the game's tension.Entertainment Weekly gave the game an A− and wrote that "Where the movie had no armament and only one full-grown monster, this game has an armed-to-her-teeth Ripley racing against time to smoke hordes of fanged critters."

Accolades

The Genesis version was chosen by three of GameFan'''s four editors as the Best Movie Game, a category for the publication's 1992 Golden Megawards. For the 1993 Golden Megawards, the SNES version won in the category of Best Action/Adventure game, and was the runner-up for Best Movie Game, losing to the Genesis version of Disney's Aladdin. In 1995, Total! ranked the game 30th on their Top 100 SNES Games writing: "The graphics are mean 'n' moody just like the film and the platform shoot-‘em-up action just seems to draw you fight in.  It’s a superb blast." IGN rated the SNES version 56th on its Top 100 SNES Games.

Notes

References

External links
 Alien 3 (Game Boy version) at MobyGames
 Alien 3 (NES version) at MobyGames
 Alien 3 (SNES version) at MobyGames
 Alien 3 (all other versions) at MobyGames

1992 video games
1993 video games
Acclaim Entertainment games
Alien (franchise) games
Amiga games
Commodore 64 games
Game Boy games
LJN games
Master System games
Multiplayer and single-player video games
Nintendo Entertainment System games
Game Gear games
Sega Genesis games
Super Nintendo Entertainment System games
Video games based on films
Video games featuring female protagonists
Video games scored by David Whittaker
Video games scored by Matt Furniss
Video games set on fictional planets
Virgin Interactive games
Video games developed in the United Kingdom